The 169th Street station was a local station on the demolished IRT Third Avenue Line in the Bronx, New York City. It was originally opened on September 2, 1888 by the Suburban Rapid Transit Company, and had three tracks and two side platforms. It was the northern terminus of the Third Avenue elevated for over two weeks. In 1902, the station and the rest of the Third Avenue elevated were acquired by Interborough Rapid Transit Company. The next stop to the north was Claremont Parkway. The next stop to the south was 166th Street. The station closed on April 29, 1973. The site of the former station is next to the Frederick Douglass Academy III Secondary School.

References

External links

IRT Third Avenue Line stations
Railway stations in the United States opened in 1888
Railway stations closed in 1973
1888 establishments in New York (state)
1973 disestablishments in New York (state)
Former elevated and subway stations in the Bronx
Third Avenue